Whitianga is a town on the Coromandel Peninsula, in the Waikato region of New Zealand's North Island. The town is located on Mercury Bay, on the northeastern coast of the peninsula.

Demographics

Whitianga North had a population of 5,493 at the 2018 New Zealand census, an increase of 1,086 people (24.6%) since the 2013 census, and an increase of 1,689 people (44.4%) since the 2006 census. There were 2,271 households, comprising 2,691 males and 2,805 females, giving a sex ratio of 0.96 males per female, with 882 people (16.1%) aged under 15 years, 729 (13.3%) aged 15 to 29, 2,310 (42.1%) aged 30 to 64, and 1,575 (28.7%) aged 65 or older.

Ethnicities were 90.3% European/Pākehā, 14.6% Māori, 2.1% Pacific peoples, 3.7% Asian, and 1.7% other ethnicities. People may identify with more than one ethnicity.

The percentage of people born overseas was 18.5, compared with 27.1% nationally.

Although some people chose not to answer the census's question about religious affiliation, 57.1% had no religion, 31.1% were Christian, 0.6% had Māori religious beliefs, 0.4% were Hindu, 0.2% were Muslim, 0.7% were Buddhist and 1.6% had other religions.

Of those at least 15 years old, 567 (12.3%) people had a bachelor's or higher degree, and 1,011 (21.9%) people had no formal qualifications. 450 people (9.8%) earned over $70,000 compared to 17.2% nationally. The employment status of those at least 15 was that 1,788 (38.8%) people were employed full-time, 879 (19.1%) were part-time, and 93 (2.0%) were unemployed.

Geography
Whitianga is located on the eastern side of the Coromandel Peninsula,  from Auckland (by road; 84 km direct distance),  from Thames,  from Tairua. The town centre is at the southern end of the beach.

Buffalo Beach is named after , a Royal Navy ship which was wrecked during a storm while anchored in Mercury Bay. Her anchor can be seen at a monument at Buffalo Beach.

A passenger ferry crosses from Whitianga to Ferry Landing, close to Cooks Beach. The alternative to the two-minute ferry crossing is a 45-minute drive around Whitianga Harbour.

History

Māori history
Whitianga has been continuously occupied for more than a thousand years since Māori explorer Kupe’s tribe settled here after his visit in about 950 AD. Following this visit, many of Kupe's tribe settled here. Te Whitianga o Kupe is the original place name of the town, meaning Kupe's crossing place.

Whitianga Pā, located on the ferry landing side of the river is a notable site. According to Ngāti Hei history the earliest known chief occupying the rock was Hei Turepe. The Pā is protected on three sides by sheer cliffs. The hill leading up to the pā on the fourth side is defended by a 22-foot man-made ditch which is now part of the track leading down to Back Bay where pā inhabitants had access to shellfish. On Cook's visit to the site in November 1769, the inhabitants who welcomed him believed the pā had been disused for a generation since it had been attacked by a Tauranga chief who married the slain chief's wife and settled peacefully into the area. Whitianga rock has several holes cut into the stone that were used as firepits, water stores, and palisade holes. Cook noted burnt palisade stumps as evidence that an earlier attack had evicted the ancient pā's residents.

Captain Cook's visit – 1769

The people of Hei commemorated their leader in a few place names, one being the bay at the head of which he had settled, Te Whanganui A Hei, (the Great Bay of Hei). This large sheltered bay was later renamed by Captain James Cook when he came here in November 1769 to observe the transit of Mercury. Cook was accompanied by Charles Green, the Royal Society expedition astronomer who died on the homeward journey in 1771.

From Cook's journal – "my reasons for putting in here were the hopes of discerning a good harbour and the desire I had of being in some convenient place to observe the Transit of Mercury, which happens on the 9th instant and will be wholly visible here if the day is clear between 5 and 6 o'clock." Cook also named the Whitianga Harbour "River of Mangroves" and this area is still referred to as "The River".

The sighting of the Transit of Mercury is commemorated at Cooks Beach by a cairn of Coromandel granite which tells the story: "In this bay was anchored 5 Nov 1769, HMS Endeavour, Lieutenant James Cook RN, Commander. He observed the transit of Mercury and named this bay."

European settlement
The original European settlement was situated on the opposite side of the river from approximately 1836 to 1881.

HMS Buffalo is a wreck in Mercury Bay; this ship was the first ship to settle the people of the Adelaide company who established the city of Adelaide in South Australia.

Industry

Historically, Whitianga was a centre for boat building, kauri milling, flax milling, gold mining and gum digging. For many years, it was a leading timber port, with sailing ships from Norway, Sweden, France, Italy and Great Britain coming to load timber. Overseas vessels of 2000 tons with a draught of 18" and carrying with their decks loads over a million feet of timber worked the harbour entrance. The larger ships were towed into the port from near Centre Island. Over a period of sixty years, it is estimated over 500 million feet of kauri was exported from the Whitianga district.

The first kauri gum was exported in 1844. It reached its peak in 1899 when over 11,000 long tons of gum was exported at an average of $120 per ton.

Today Whitianga serves as a small regional centre for the eastern side of the Coromandel Peninsula and Mercury Bay area. It is a focal point for local fishing, farming and tourism industry, such as the nearby Te Whanganui-A-Hei (Cathedral Cove) marine reserve and associated famous beach and cave. Cathedral Cove was used in the movie The Chronicles of Narnia: Prince Caspian.

The area surrounding Whitianga (222 square km) is currently under a mineral prospecting license granted by the Crown to mining company Waihi Gold (a subsidiary of Newmont Corporation Colorado, USA).

Social

74.8% of Whitianga residents are New Zealand born, 85.1% identify as European, and 17% are of Maori descent. Whitianga has a relatively large number of older residents. 32.3% of residents are aged 60 years and over (the New Zealand average for this age group is 19.8%). It also has a large number of baches or holiday homes. 39.1% of the private dwellings in Whitianga were unoccupied on Census night, 2013. (By contrast, the average number of unoccupied dwellings in New Zealand was 11.1%).

In 2013 Whitianga had an unemployment level of 6.2%, lower than the national average of 7.1. 36.2% of households with income were in the lowest quartile, earning under $33,000 (versus 25% of people nationwide), 33.5% in the medium lowest (versus 25% nationwide), 21% in the medium highest (versus 25% nationwide), and 9.4% earned income over $109,431 which put them in the highest quartile (versus 25% nationwide). Whitianga scored 1008 on the Social Deprivation Index.

Education
A District High School opened in 1951 and moved to the present site two years later. In February 1981 it became an area school.

Transport
Whitianga is served by State Highway 25, the main highway looping around the Coromandel Peninsula. It is also served by the small Whitianga Aerodrome, which receives flights by Air Auckland with their Cessna 172 and 206 on a regular basis, FlyStark with their Cessna 172 and GippsAero GA8 Airvan aeroplanes and Sunair with their Cessna 172 and Piper Aztec planes. InterCity buses and Go Kiwi Shuttle serve the community with transportation to Whitianga from Thames, Auckland and other locations around the Coromandel Peninsula and North Island.

Media
Whitianga is served by The Mercury Bay Informer, The Hauraki Herald, and Coromandel's More FM.

Events
An annual scallop festival is held in September every year to celebrate seafood, particularly scallops.

The Whitianga Speed Festival was held in 2009 and 2010.

A New Year's Eve festival and concert, known as Coromandel Gold, was held from 2009 to 2012.

References

External links

 Local website
 MBBA Website
 Local newspaper

Thames-Coromandel District
Populated places in Waikato